Petar Skok (1 March 1881 – 3 February 1956) was a Croatian linguist and onomastics expert.

History
Skok was born to a Croatian family in the village of Jurkovo Selo, Žumberak. From 1892 to 1900 he attended the Higher Real Gymnasium in Rakovac near Karlovac. At the University of Vienna (1900 – 1904) he studied Romance and Germanic philology and Indo-European studies, passing his professorship exam in 1906. He received Ph.D. with a thesis on South French toponomastics.

As a high-school professor he taught in Banja Luka and served as a librarian of the Royal museum in Sarajevo. In the period from 1919 to his retirement, he worked at the Romance seminar department of the Faculty of Philosophy at the University of Zagreb, and taught French language and literature at Viša pedagoška škola in Zagreb.

He started writing as a gymnasium student, having published literary reviews under the pseudonym of P. S. Mikov. Later he devoted himself completely to southeastern Europe linguistic studies, chiefly of Romance languages: Vulgar Latin, Dalmatian, with special interest to Romance influence on Croatian dialects and other languages in Southeast Europe. He studied history of Slavs, languages and interactions of languages from eastern coast of Adriatic into hinterland with special care to onomastics. Thanks to Skok's effort, the centre of Croatian onomastics studies has been since 1948 in the institution which is today Institute of Croatian Language and Linguistics.

Skok died in Zagreb.

Works
As an extremely prolific writer, Skok published dozens of books and hundreds of research papers in journals; his "revised" bibliography by Žarko Muljačić extends it to more than 650 works. Some of his notable books are:
 Naša pomorska i ribarska terminologija na Jadranu (Split, 1933)
 Dolazak Slavena na Mediteran (Split, 1934)
 Pregled francuske gramatike I–II (Zagreb, 1938–1939)
 Osnove romanske lingvistike, I–III (Zagreb, 1940)
 Slavenstvo i romanstvo na jadranskim otocima I–II (Zagreb, 1950)
 

He left in manuscript unfinished etymological dictionary that was published post mortem in 4 volumes under the title of Etimologijski rječnik hrvatskoga ili srpskoga jezika ("An etymological dictionary of Croatian or Serbian language"), 1971–1974, and which represents up until today the most voluminous Croatian etymological dictionary with more than 10 000 headwords. In the words of academic August Kovačec, Skok's etymological dictionary is a synthesis of "his  scientific efforts as a whole in the fields of etymology and linguistics generally" and represents the most notable "contribution of a scientific individual to Croatian language and the study of Croatian language in the 20th century". Skok left his dictionary unfinished in manuscript - his notes were processed by his disciple and co-worker Valentin Putanec.

Later development of Skok's dictionary is directed twofoldly. The first one is by supplement, with the most valuable contribution being a work of Vojmir Vinja Jadranske etimologije: Jadranske dopune Skokovu etimologijskom rječniku ("Adriatic etymologies: Adriatic addenda to Skok's etymological dictionary") in three volumes. The last volume - the very much necessary index - is being prepared for publication.

The other direction is reducing massive Skok's dictionary into handbook work, more accessible to wider readership. Alemko Gluhak has thus published Hrvatski etimologijski rječnik (Zagreb, 1993, 832 pp.) with about 1800 headwords, about 7800 Croatian lexemes and more than 1000 personal names, native Croatian and of foreign origin, accompanied with a brief account of basic terms on genetic relationship among languages of the world.

Legacy
In the honour of Petar Skok etymological-onomastics conferences are held with contributions of Croatian and foreign experts. So far six of them have been held, chronologically in Zagreb (1987), Zadar, Pula, Krk, Vukovar and in Korčula (2006).

References

External links
 

1881 births
1956 deaths
Burials at Mirogoj Cemetery
Linguists from Croatia
Members of the Croatian Academy of Sciences and Arts
People from Žumberak, Croatia
University of Vienna alumni
Academic staff of the University of Zagreb
20th-century linguists